El Último perro is a 1956 Argentine film directed by Lucas Demare. It was entered into the 1956 Cannes Film Festival.

Cast
 Domingo Sapelli - Don Facundo
 Hugo del Carril - Nicasio
 Rosa Catá - Dona Juana
 Nelly Panizza - Martina
 Gloria Ferrandiz - Dona Fe
 Nelly Meden - Maria Fabiana
 Mario Passano - El Nato
 Jacinto Herrera - Cantalicio
 Ana Casares - Julia

References

External links

1956 films
Argentine historical drama films
1950s Spanish-language films
Films directed by Lucas Demare
1950s Argentine films
1950s historical drama films